Karabo Lerato Khakhau is a South African politician and the Youngest Member of South Africa's National Assembly for the Democratic Alliance since November 2022. She had previously served as a DA member of the Free State Provincial Legislature. Aged 21 years at the time of her election to the provincial legislature, she became the youngest ever member of provincial legislature in South Africa. Khakhau was previously the president of the student representative council of the University of Cape Town.

Early life and education
Khakhau hails from Welkom in the Free State. She matriculated from Welkom-Gimnasiumin 2015. She thereafter studied towards a Bachelor of Social Science Degree where she majored in Politics & Governance, Sociology, and Social Development  at the University of Cape Town. She, in 2019, put her academic career on pause and dedicated her time towards public service in the Free State Legislature. She holds a Graduate Certificate in Advanced Governance and Public Leadership from the University of the Witwatersrand.

Political career
Khakhau joined the Democratic Alliance in 2016. As a student activist she served as the Democratic Alliance Students Organisation (DASO) Branch Chairperson of the University of Cape Town. She was also elected the DASO Western Cape Provincial Interim Chairperson. In October 2017, the DA's student organisation won a majority of nine out of the fifteen seats on the student representative council of the University of Cape Town. She received the highest students votes in this election and was elected president of the SRC not so long after.

After the provincial election that was held on 8 May 2019, Khakhau was nominated to the Free State Provincial Legislature as the party's support in the province grew. She was sworn in as a member of the legislature on 22 May 2019. Consequently, she became the youngest ever member, since she was only 21 when she assumed office.

On 15 November 2022, Khakhau resigned from the Free State Legislature to take up the former DA provincial leader in the Free State, Patricia Kopane's seat in the National Assembly. She was sworn in as a Member of Parliament on 16 November. The DA's caucus leader in the Dihlabeng Municipality, Jafta Mokoena, replaced Khaukau in the Provincial Legislature.

References

External links

Living people
Year of birth missing (living people)
Democratic Alliance (South Africa) politicians
21st-century South African politicians
21st-century South African women politicians
Women members of provincial legislatures of South Africa
Members of the Free State Provincial Legislature
Members of the National Assembly of South Africa
Women members of the National Assembly of South Africa
People from Welkom